"Miss Hit and Run" is a song written by Lynsey de Paul and Barry Blue. Blue released the single in 1974 as a follow up single to "School Love" on Bell Records in the UK, Germany, Italy and Spain and on the Barclay label in France and recorded it with a "Beach Boys" type of arrangement. The single sided acetate label of the single reveals that the original title was "Little Miss Hit and Run", confirming what was reported in the music press at the time. The song was Blue's fourth consecutive hit, reaching number 26 on the UK Singles Chart in August 1974. It also reached number 9 on Capitol Radio's "Capitol Countdown" chart, and spent three weeks on the Dutch Tipparade. It was also a track on the K-Tel album, Music Explosion and the Polydor LP "20 Super Power Hits".

Notable TV performances of the song included appearances on 10 August 1974 on TopPop, the Dutch pop music program as well as on the BBC programme Top of the Pops. It was re-released by Blue as the B-side to "Do You Wanna Dance" in 1980. The song has been released on a number of Barry Blue compilation CDs such as The Singles Collection, Dancin' (On A Saturday Night)... Best Of. and most recently Out of the Blue - 50 Years of Discovery (2021).

References

Songs written by Lynsey de Paul
Songs written by Barry Blue
1974 songs
Bell Records singles